Ceylon Today is an English language Sri Lankan daily newspaper published by Ceylon Newspapers (Private) Limited. It was founded in 2011 and is published from Colombo. Its sister newspaper is the Mawbima. Ceylon Newspapers (Private) Limited is owned by politician Tiran Alles. The first edition of the newspaper was published on 18 November 2011.

Editor in chief Lalith Allahakkoon was sacked on 13 June 2012. His replacement was Hana Ibrahim. Ibrahim is a past treasurer of the Free Media Movement (FMM) and tried to prevent the FMM from reacting to Allahakkoon's sacking. Ibrahim later resigned from the FMM.

References

External links
  	

Daily newspapers published in Sri Lanka
English-language newspapers published in Sri Lanka
Publications established in 2011
Mass media in Colombo